Vera Hohlfeld (born 24 February 1972) is a road cyclist from Germany. She represented her nation at the 1996 Summer Olympics where she finished fourth in the women's road race.

References

External links
 profile at sports-reference.com

German female cyclists
Cyclists at the 1996 Summer Olympics
Olympic cyclists of Germany
Living people
Sportspeople from Erfurt
1972 births
Cyclists from Thuringia
People from Bezirk Erfurt
20th-century German women